Provins station (French: Gare de Provins) is a French railway station located in the commune of Provins, Seine-et-Marne department in the Île-de-France region. The station opened on 11 December 1858 and is located on the Longueville–Esternay railway line. The station is served by TER (local) services operated by SNCF: Transilien line P (Paris–Longueville–Provins).

The section of the railway between Provins and Esternay is closed.

Gallery

See also 

 List of SNCF stations in Île-de-France
 List of Transilien stations

External links

 
Transilien Network Map
Transilien website

Railway stations in Seine-et-Marne
Railway stations in France opened in 1858